360 km is a rural locality (a settlement) in Zagorskoye Rural Settlement of Novokuznetsky District, Russia. The population was 58 as of 2010.

Geography 
360 km is located 15 km northwest of Novokuznetsk (the district's administrative centre) by road. Kalachevo is the nearest rural locality.

Streets 
There is no streets with titles.

References 

Rural localities in Kemerovo Oblast